The white-nosed coati (Nasua narica), also known as the coatimundi, is a species of coati and a member of the family Procyonidae (raccoons and their relatives). Local Spanish names for the species include pizote, antoon, and tejón, depending upon the region.

Distribution and habitat

The white-nosed coati is distributed from as far north as Flagstaff, Arizona, New Mexico, through Mexico, Central America, and the far northwestern region of Colombia near the border with Panama.

Coatis from Cozumel Island have been treated as a separate species, the Cozumel Island coati, but the vast majority of recent authorities treat it as a subspecies, N. narica nelsoni, of the white-nosed coati. They are smaller than white-nosed coatis from the adjacent mainland (N. n. yucatanica), but when compared more widely to white-nosed coatis the difference in size is not as clear. The level of other differences also support its status as a subspecies rather than separate species.

White-nosed coatis have also been found in Florida, where they were introduced. It is unknown precisely when introduction occurred; an early specimen in the Florida Museum of Natural History, labeled an "escaped captive", dates to 1928. There are several later documented cases of coatis escaping captivity, and since the 1970s there have been a number of sightings, and several live and dead specimens of various ages have been found. These reports have occurred over a wide area of southern Florida, and there is probable evidence of breeding, indicating that the population is well established.

Behavior and ecology
White-nosed coatis are known pollinators of the balsa tree, as observed in a study of a white-nosed coati population in Costa Rica. The coati were observed inserting their noses into the flowers of the tree and ingesting nectar, while the flower showed no subsequent signs of damage. Pollen from the flowers covers the face of the coati following feeding, and later disseminates through the surrounding forest following detachment. Scientists observed a dependent relationship between the balsa tree, which provides a critical resource of hydration and nutrition to the white-nosed coati when environmental resources are scarce, and the coati, which increases proliferation of the tree through pollination.

Feeding habits
The white-nosed coati is an omnivore and forages mostly on the ground for small vertebrates, fruits, carrion, insects, snakes, and eggs. It can climb trees easily and uses its tail for balancing.

References

External links

Smithsonian Wild: Nasua narica

Procyonidae
Carnivorans of North America
Carnivorans of Central America
Carnivorans of South America
Mammals of the Caribbean
Mammals of Colombia
Mammals of Mexico
Mammals of the United States
Fauna of the Southwestern United States
Mammals described in 1766
Least concern biota of North America
Least concern biota of South America
Taxa named by Carl Linnaeus